Ksenia Popova (born 1988) is a World Champion open water swimmer from Russia. At the 2008 Open Water Worlds, she won the Women's 25K race.

She has swum for Russia at the:
 World Championships: 2003, 2007
 Open Water Worlds: 2004, 2006, 2008

References

1988 births
Living people
Female long-distance swimmers
Russian female swimmers
World Aquatics Championships medalists in open water swimming